Barentsiidae is a family of Entoprocta belonging to the order Solitaria.

Genera:
 Barentsia  Hincks, 1880
 Coriella  Kluge, 1946
 Pedicellinopsis  Hincks, 1884
 Pseudopedicellina  Toriumi, 1951
 Urnatella  Leidy, 1851

References

Entoprocta